Harold Boyes Watson  (23 October 1893 – 19 March 1972) was an English first-class cricketer and an officer in both the British Army and the British Indian Army.

Watson was born in October 1893 at St Margarets, Middlesex. He served in the First World War, being commissioned into the British Army as a second lieutenant with the West Yorkshire Regiment in August 1914. He was second with the 26th Provisional Battalion in August 1915, and upon its disbandment prior to the Military Service Act 1916, he became  liable for overseas service. He was promoted to the rank of lieutenant in November 1916, precedence from July 1916. In May 1917, he was seconded for duty with the British Indian Army, where he served with 3rd Skinner's Horse. He saw action in Balochistan against the Marri and Khetran tribes in 1918. During a Marri attack on Gumbaz Fort on 19 December 1918, Watson was one of two officer's charged with the defence of the fort. For his actions in the successful defence, he was awarded the Military Cross. In March 1919, he was made a temporary captain.

He returned to England in 1919 to study at Trinity College, Oxford. While studying at Oxford, he made a single appearance in first-class cricket for Oxford University against Australian Imperial Forces at Oxford in 1919. Batting once in the match, he scored 2 runs in the Oxford first innings before he was dismissed by Charlie Kelleway, while with the ball he took the wickets of Kelleway and Bert Oldfield in the Australian Imperial Forces first innings, conceding 35 runs. He relinquished his commission in the West Yorkshire Regiment in September 1921, retaining the rank of captain. After graduating from Oxford, Watson worked as an assistant education officer in Birmingham, before being appointed director of education for Southend in May 1931. Watson died in March 1972 at Thorpe Bay, Essex.

References

External links

1893 births
1972 deaths
People from Twickenham
West Yorkshire Regiment officers
British Army personnel of World War I
British Indian Army officers
Recipients of the Military Cross
Alumni of Trinity College, Oxford
English cricketers
Oxford University cricketers